The 2022–23 Saudi Women's Premier League is the inaugural season of the Saudi Women's Premier League which replaced the Saudi Women's National League as the top-level women's football league in Saudi Arabia. 

On 15 September 2022, the Saudi Arabian Football Federation announced the launch of the revamped format for women's football competitions by introducing the Saudi Women's Premier League and Women's First Division.

Initially, all eight teams that qualified for the knockout stage of the 2021–22 Saudi National women's league earned their place in the inaugural Saudi Women's Premier League. Women's football in the kingdom started getting the attention of the Saudis. Professional Saudi clubs bought self-owned teams in order to participate in the league. Al Hilal SFC and Al Nassr FC one of the biggest names in Saudi football were announced as participants in the new women's league. with Al-Nassr taking over 2021-22 women's football league champions Al-Mamlaka FC while Al-Hilal took over the 2021–22 women's football league runners-up the Challenge. on 25 September 2022 SAFF announced that Al-Ittihad took over Jeddah Eagles to be the third professional club to do so. Al-Ahli Saudi FC and Al Shabab FC completed the line-up by taking over Miraas Jeddah Club and the Storm club respectively.

Teams
Eight teams will contest the 2022–23 Women's Premier League season. the eight teams that qualified for the 2021-22 women's football league knockout stage were confirmed as the participating teams for the first season.

Personnel and kits

League table

Results 
The schedule was published by SAFF on the 15th of September.

Season statistics

Top scorers

Clean sheets

Hat-tricks

Discipline

Foreign players

References

External links

Women's football in Saudi Arabia
2022–23 in Saudi Arabian football
2022 in women's association football
2023 in women's association football